Attoutou is a town in southern Ivory Coast. It is a sub-prefecture of Jacqueville Department in Grands-Ponts Region, Lagunes District. The town is on the south coast of Ébrié Lagoon.

The town—but not the sub-prefecture—is sometimes referred to as Attoutou A. 

Attoutou was a commune until March 2012, when it became one of 1126 communes nationwide that were abolished.

The Attoutou sub-prefecture also contains the town Taboth.

In 2014, the population of the sub-prefecture of Attoutou was 24,020.

Villages
The 16 villages of the sub-prefecture of Attoutou and their populations in 2014 are:

References

Sub-prefectures of Grands-Ponts
Former communes of Ivory Coast